Estola insularis is a species of beetle in the family Cerambycidae. It was described by Blair in 1933.

Subspecies
 Estola insularis cribrata Blair, 1933
 Estola insularis duncani Van Dyke, 1953
 Estola insularis insularis Blair, 1933
 Estola insularis subnigrescens Breuning, 1974

References

Estola
Beetles described in 1933